Raymond J. Casey (1900 in San Francisco, California – 1986 in Palo Alto, California) was a top-ranked tennis player and coach.

A large and very powerful man for his time, Casey was a 12-letter man in athletics at the University of California, Berkeley.  A left-hander, he was considered to have one of the fastest serves in the world.  Although he won numerous tournaments on the West Coast, he played only twice in any of the four major Grand Slam tournaments.   In the summer of 1925 he travelled with an American contingent to England.  According to the Official Encyclopedia of Tennis, at the Eastbourne tournament Casey beat Patrick Wheatley of Great Britain in a 6–0 set that took only 9 minutes.  This is still considered the fastest set ever played in a tournament match.  Later, Casey and John Hennessey reached the finals of the Wimbledon doubles.  In an era in which tournament doubles matches were considered almost as important as singles, they lost one of the most famous matches in the early history of tennis, being beaten 4–6, 9–11, 6–4, 6–1, 3–6 by one of the great French teams of Jean Borotra and René Lacoste.  Later that summer, Casey won his opening matches in the American championship in New York but was forced to withdraw by a sudden case of appendicitis.

In the 1950s and 1960s Casey was a successful tennis coach in Santa Monica, California, his most noted pupils being Bob Lutz and Julie Anthony.  He is a member of the Northern California Tennis Hall of Fame.

Grand Slam finals

Doubles (1 runner-up)

See also
List of male tennis players

External links
 
 London Newspaper Cartoon of Casey at Wimbledon

1900 births
1986 deaths
American male tennis players
American tennis coaches
California Golden Bears men's tennis players
Tennis players from San Francisco